Nuno da Cunha (c. 1487 – March 5, 1539) was a Portuguese admiral who was governor of Portuguese possessions in India from 1529 to 1538. He was the governor of Portuguese Asia that ruled for more time in the sixteenth century in a total of nine years. He was the son of Antónia Pais and Tristão da Cunha, the famous Portuguese navigator, admiral and ambassador to Pope Leo X. Nuno da Cunha proved his mettle in battles at Oja and Brava, and at the capture of Panane, under the viceroy Francisco de Almeida. Named by João III ninth governor of Portuguese possessions in India, he served from April 1529 to 1538. He was named to end the government of governor Lopo Vaz de Sampaio (1526–1529) and brought orders, by King John III of Portugal, to send Sampaio in chains for Portugal. This delicate mission by the King was justified by their close connection ever since the king was still a prince.

On his passage to Goa, he subdued the pirates at Mombasa who had been harassing the coast of Portuguese Mozambique. Mozambique had been brought within the Portuguese trading orbit and provided watering stations essential to Portugal's lifeline to the west coast of India. Nuno's brothers Pero Vaz da Cunha and Simão da Cunha were expected to serve under him as second and third in command, a form of nepotism that was expected in the Portuguese Estado da Índia. However, they died on the voyage, and Nuno was forced to rely upon local networks of clientage in Goa during his long rule.

In 1529, Nuno sent an expedition that sacked and burned the city of Damão on the Arabian Sea at the mouth of the Damão River, about 100 miles north of Mumbai in the Muslim state of Gujarat. Forces under his control captured Baxay (now Vasai, often mistaken for Basra in Iraq) from the Muslim ruler of Gujarat, Bahadur Shah, on January 20, 1533. The next year, renamed Bassein, the city became the capital of the Portuguese province of the North, and the great citadel of black basalt, still standing, was begun. (It was completed in 1548.)

Forced to return to Portugal as a result of court intrigues, he was shipwrecked at the Cape of Good Hope and drowned. His first marriage was to Maria da Cunha, and his second marriage was to Isabel da Silveira. The main source for Nuno da Cunha's career is the Portuguese historian João de Barros (1496–1570), famous for his history of the Portuguese in their overseas territories. The work,  is full of lively detail, with incidents described like the king of Viantana's killing of the Portuguese ambassadors to Malacca with boiling water and their bodies thrown to dogs.

External links
Portugal: Dicionario Historico
Cunha coat-of-arms
 Andreia Martins de Carvalho, "Family networks and clientelism: impact on the political structure and decision making of the “Estado da Índia”": abstract

Governors-General of Portuguese India
Portuguese explorers
1483 births
1539 deaths
Deaths by drowning
1520s in Portuguese India
1530s in Portuguese India
1529 in India
1538 in India
16th-century explorers
15th-century Portuguese people
16th-century Portuguese people